Spariolenus taprobanicus, is a species of spider of the genus Spariolenus. It is endemic to Sri Lanka.

See also
 List of Sparassidae species

References

Spiders described in 1837
Sparassidae
Endemic fauna of Sri Lanka
Spiders of Asia